Guitar Man is a studio album by George Benson. The album was released by Concord Jazz on October 4, 2011. Largely instrumental, it finds Benson revisiting his 1960s/early 1970s guitar playing roots with a twelve-song collection of covers of both jazz and pop standards overseen by producer John Burk.

Track listing

Personnel 
 George Benson – guitar (1-12), arrangements (2-6, 8, 9), vocals (3, 8, 11, 12)
 Ray Fuller – rhythm guitar (2)
 Paul Jackson Jr. – rhythm guitar (2)
 David Garfield – acoustic piano (2, 4, 11), keyboards (2-8, 12), arrangements (2, 4, 8, 11, 12), rhythm arrangements (7)
 Joe Sample – acoustic piano (5, 8, 9, 12)
 Chris Walden – keyboards (7), arrangements (7)
 Freddie Washington – bass (2)
 Ben Williams – bass (3-5, 7-9, 12)
 Oscar Seaton Jr. – drums (2)
 Harvey Mason – drums (3-5, 7-9, 12)
 Lenny Castro – percussion (3, 5, 6, 12)
 Dan Higgins – flute (2), alto flute (2), clarinet (2)
 Charlie Bisharat – viola (2, 7), violin (2, 7)
 Oscar Castro-Neves – orchestration (2)

Production 
 Producer – John Beck
 Executive Producers – John Beck and Noel Lee
 Recording Engineers – Mauricio Cajueiro, Geoff Gillette, Seth Presant, Al Schmitt and Yutaka Yokokura.
 Additional Recording – Aran Lavi
 Assistant Engineers – Aaron Mattes and Aaron Walk
 Recorded at The Village Studios (Los Angeles, CA); Entourage Studios (North Hollywood, CA); Visual Rhythm Studios (Alhambra, CA); Porcupine Studios (London, UK); DB Studios (Tel Aviv, Israel).
 Mixed by Seth Presant at The Village Studios (Los Angeles, California).
 Mastered by Paul Blakemore at CMG Mastering (Cleveland, Ohio).
 Art Direction – Larissa Collins 
 Design – Greg Allen
 Photography – Marco Glaviano

References 

George Benson albums
2011 albums
Concord Records albums